Alawathugoda Saman Devalaya is an ancient Devalaya, situated in Alawatugoda, Sri Lanka. The shrine is dedicated to Sinhalese deity Saman. The history of the Devalaya is believed to be dated back to the reign of King Walagamba (89–77 BC) of Anuradhapura Kingdom. During the Portuguese era the shrine was burnt down by the Portuguese armies but rebuilt again in 1814. Currently the shrine has been formally recognized by the government as an archaeological protected monument. The designation was declared on 8 April 2009 under the government Gazette number 1597.

See also
 Maha Saman Devalaya

References

Notes

 

Buildings and structures in Kandy District
Tourist attractions in Central Province, Sri Lanka
Archaeological protected monuments in Kandy District